Nothofagus betuloides, Magellan's beech or guindo, is a tree native to southern Patagonia.

In 1769, Sir Joseph Banks collected a specimen of the tree in Tierra del Fuego during Captain Cook's first voyage.

Its occurrence on Hornos Island earns it the distinction of being the southernmost tree on Earth.

Distribution
Nothofagus betuloides grows from southern Chile and southern Argentina (40°S) to Tierra del Fuego (56°S). One specimen growing near the southeastern corner of Hornos Island (Cape Horn) was identified in 2019 as the southernmost tree in the world.

Description
In its natural environment, it tolerates cold winters and absence of heat in summer.

Cultivation
It succeeds in Scotland. Trees planted in the Faroe Islands, which were imported directly from its southernmost distribution in Tierra del Fuego, have turned out to be very hardy.

The wood has beautiful marks, and is pinkish, hard, and semiheavy; it is used in furniture and construction.

References

Donoso, C. 2005. Árboles nativos de Chile. Guía de reconocimiento. Edición 4. Marisa Cuneo Ediciones, Valdivia, Chile. 136p.
Hoffmann, Adriana. 1998. Flora Silvestre de Chile, Zona Central. Edición 4. Fundación Claudio Gay, Santiago. 254p.
Rodríguez, R. &  Quezada, M. 2003. Fagaceae. En C. Marticorena y R. Rodríguez [eds.], Flora de Chile Vol. 2(2), pp 64–76. Universidad de Concepción, Concepción.

Nothofagaceae
Flora of southern Chile
Flora of South Argentina
Trees of mild maritime climate
Trees of subpolar oceanic climate
Garden plants of South America
Ornamental trees
Fagales of Argentina
Fagales of Chile
Flora of the Valdivian temperate rainforest